Allies is the eighth album by Crosby, Stills & Nash, their second concert document, and released on Atlantic Records in 1983. A live concert clip for "Wasted on the Way" received some rotation on MTV and VH1 at the time, as did the single "War Games". It peaked at No. 43 on the Billboard 200.

Content
The album starts off with two studio recordings. The lead track "War Games" was written for the 1983 film WarGames and was released as a single by the group, which peaked at No. 45 on the Billboard Hot 100. This song was used in initial early promotional theatrical trailers and in a promotional video for MTV, but their participation in the project was cancelled at the last moment. The MTV video for the song was composed solely of scenes from the movie. The second studio track, "Raise a Voice" by Stephen Stills and Graham Nash, was appended to the 2006 re-issue of Daylight Again as a bonus track.

The rest of the album consists of live recordings from two different tours. The tracks "Shadow Captain" and "He Played Real Good For Free" were recorded in Houston, Texas, on the 1977 tour for the CSN album. Presumably they were chosen as they were strong David Crosby performances, something becoming more difficult for Crosby to muster evidenced by his minimal participation on the band's previous studio album as he dealt with personal difficulties that would eventually lead to his time in prison. The rest of the album derives from a show at the new Universal Amphitheatre in Universal City, California, on the 1982 tour to promote Daylight Again.

David Crosby would spend time in prison in Texas during 1986, putting the group on temporary hiatus. As a result, there would not be another Crosby, Stills & Nash album until 1988 and their reunion with Neil Young, that five-year gap the longest between releases by the group to that point in time.

Track listing

Side one

Side two

Personnel 
 David Crosby – vocals, guitars
 Stephen Stills – vocals, guitars, keyboards
 Graham Nash – vocals, guitars, keyboards

Additional musicians
 Danny Kortchmar – electric guitar on "War Games" and "Raise a Voice"
 Michael Stergis – electric guitar on "Raise a Voice"
 James Newton Howard – keyboards on "War Games", "Turn Your Back on Love", "Barrel of Pain", "Dark Star" and "For What It's Worth"
 Mike Finnigan – additional vocals on "Barrel of Pain," keyboards on "Turn Your Back on Love", "Barrel of Pain", "Dark Star" and "For What It's Worth" 
 Craig Doerge – keyboards on "War Games", "Raise a Voice" and "Shadow Captain"
 George "Chocolate" Perry – bass
 Joe Vitale – drums all tracks except "War Games" and "Raise a Voice"
 Jeff Porcaro – drums on "War Games" and "Raise a Voice"
 Efrain Toro – percussion on "Turn Your Back on Love", "Barrel of Pain", "Dark Star" and "For What It's Worth"
 Joe Lala – percussion on "Shadow Captain"

Production
 Stephen Stills, Graham Nash, Stanley Johnston – producers
 Ron Albert, Howard Albert – co-producers on "Shadow Captain" and "For Free"
 Steve Gursky, David Hewitt, Stanley Johnston, Jay Parti— engineers
 Jeff Kallestad, Gerry Lentz, and Doug Williams — assistant engineers

Charts

References

Crosby, Stills, Nash & Young live albums
1983 live albums
Atlantic Records live albums
Albums produced by Graham Nash
Albums produced by Stephen Stills
Albums with cover art by Jimmy Wachtel